In chemistry, peroxycarbonate (sometimes peroxocarbonate, IUPAC name: oxocarbonate or oxidocarbonate) or percarbonate is a divalent anion with formula . It is an oxocarbon anion that consists solely of carbon and oxygen. It would be the anion of a hypothetical peroxycarbonic acid HO–CO–O–OH (sometimes peroxocarbonic acid). or the real hydroperoxyformic acid, HO-O-CO-OH (a.k.a. percarbonic acid, carbonoperoxoic acid, hydroxycarbonic acid).

The peroxycarbonate anion is formed, together with peroxydicarbonate , at the negative electrode during electrolysis of molten lithium carbonate. Lithium peroxycarbonate can be produced also by combining carbon dioxide  with lithium hydroxide in concentrated hydrogen peroxide H2O2 at −10 °C.

Electrolysis of a solution of lithium carbonate at -30° to -40 °C yields a solution of the Lithium percarbonate, which can liberate iodine from potassium iodide instantaneously. The crystalline salt has not been isolated.

The peroxycarbonate anion has been proposed as an intermediate to explain the catalytic effect of CO2 on the oxidation of organic compounds by O2.

The potassium and rubidium salts of the monovalent hydrogenperoxycarbonate anion (aka. hydroxycarbonate, biperoxycarbonate)  have also been obtained.

See also
Sodium percarbonate, actually a perhydrate of sodium carbonate.
Sodium peroxycarbonate
Orthocarbonate, hypothetical  ion

References

Oxyanions
Oxocarbons
Physical chemistry